Thuận Châu is a rural district of Sơn La province in the Northwest region of Vietnam. As of 2019, the district had a population of 172,763. The district covers an area of 1535 km². The district capital lies at Thuận Châu.

The Dry Laha (Phlao) and Kháng languages are spoken in Thuận Châu District.

References

Districts of Sơn La province
Sơn La province